The Commandant of the National Defence Academy is the head and overall in-charge of the National Defence Academy. The Commandant of the Academy is a Three-star rank officer from the three Services in rotation.  He is supported by the Deputy Commandant (a Two-star rank appointment), Brigadier Administration (Brig Adm), Principal Director (Training) (both One-Star appointments), a Civilian Principal and the Adjutant (An Officer of the rank of Lieutenant Colonel).

Commissioned as Joint Services Wing (JSW), the interim training academy was set up at the Indian Military Academy (IMA). The first Commandant of JSW was Major General Thakur Mahadeo Singh, DSO. The present-day National Defence Academy was constructed in Pune and was formally commissioned on 7 December 1954 as the successor to JSW of IMA. The program of JSW was transferred from IMA to NDA. Major General Enaith Habibullah was the last head of the JSW and the First Commandant of NDA at Pune.

Joint Services Wing at Indian Military Academy

National Defence Academy

List of Commandants by branches of service
Army - 15Navy - 11Air Force - 14

See also 
 Commandant of the Indian Military Academy
 Commandant of the National Defence College
 Commandant of Indian Naval Academy

References 

Lists of Indian military personnel
Military academies of India
Commandants of the National Defence Academy
Indian military appointments